The 2014 Giro d'Italia was the 97th running of the Giro d'Italia, one of cycling's Grand Tour races.

The race started off in Belfast, on 9 May, with a  team time trial and concluded in Trieste, on 1 June, with a  flat stage. A total of 198 riders from 22 teams entered the 21-stage race, which was won by Colombian Nairo Quintana of the  team. The second and third places were taken by Colombian Rigoberto Urán and Italian Fabio Aru, respectively.

Quintana became the first Colombian to win the Giro. He won the secondary young rider classification. In the other classifications,  rider Nacer Bouhanni was the winner of the points classification and 's Julián Arredondo won the Mountains classification.  finished as the winners of the team classification, while  won the team points classification. This was also the first grand tour where non-Europeans led for the entire race, with a Canadian, two Australians, and two Colombians wearing the Pink jersey.

Teams 

All eighteen UCI ProTeams were automatically invited and were obliged to attend the race. As the winners of the 2013 Coppa Italia rankings for Italian teams,  were invited to the race in October 2013. In January 2014, the three remaining wildcard places were decided by a vote on social media, from a shortlist of eight UCI Professional Continental teams.

The 22 teams that competed in the race were:

*: Marked UCI Professional Continental teams given wild card entry to this event.

Pre-race favourites 
Before the start of a race, Nairo Quintana, Joaquim Rodríguez, Cadel Evans, Rigoberto Urán were among the main favourites for overall victory. Other possible contenders were Domenico Pozzovivo, Michele Scarponi, Dan Martin, Ivan Basso, Rafał Majka and Przemysław Niemiec.

Stages 

The 2014 Giro has its stages categorized into five different categories, named A to E. The category of a stage determines the points given for the points classification, and for the maximum time allowed for cyclists to finish the stage. Category A is reserved for the flattest stages, while category D is for the stages with the highest mountains. Category E is for time-trial stages.

It started in Belfast on 9 May 2014 and traveled across both Northern Ireland and the Republic of Ireland. There were three rest days instead of the usual two and the race started on a Friday.

Classification leadership 

In the 2014 Giro d'Italia, four different jerseys were awarded. For the general classification, calculated by adding each cyclist's finishing times on each stage, and allowing time bonuses (10, 6 and 4 seconds respectively) for the first three finishers on mass-start stages, the leader received a pink jersey. This classification is considered the most important of the Giro d'Italia, and the winner is considered the winner of the Giro.

Additionally, there was a points classification, awarding a red jersey. In the points classification, cyclists received points for finishing in the top 15 in a stage. Unlike in the better known points classification in the Tour de France, the type of stage has no effect on what points were on offer – each stage had the same points available on the same scale. The winner earned 25 points, second place earned 20 points, third 16, fourth 14, fifth 12, sixth 10, and one point fewer per place down to a single point for 15th. In addition, points could be won in intermediate sprints.

There was a mountains classification, the leadership of which was marked by a blue jersey. In the mountains classifications, points were won by reaching the top of a climb before other cyclists. Each climb was categorized as either first, second, third, or fourth-category, with more points available for the higher-categorized climbs. The Cima Coppi, the race's highest point of elevation, was worth still more points than the other first-category climbs. The fourth jersey represents the young rider classification, marked by a white jersey. This was decided the same way as the general classification, but only riders born after 1 January 1989 were eligible.

There were two classifications for teams. In the Trofeo Fast Team classification, the times of the best three cyclists per team on each stage were added; the leading team was the team with the lowest total time; the Trofeo Super Team was a team points classification, with the top 20 placed riders on each stage earning points (20 for first place, 19 for second place and so on, down to a single point for 20th) for their team.

The rows in the following table correspond to the jerseys awarded after that stage was run.

Notes
 In stages 3, 4, and 5, Luke Durbridge, who was second in the young riders classification, wore the white jersey, because Michael Matthews (in first place) wore the pink jersey as leader of the general classification during that stage.
 In stage 4, no rider wore the red jersey after Marcel Kittel, who was first in the points classification, withdrew from the race.
 In stages 6, 7, and 8, Rafał Majka, who was second in the young riders classification, wore the white jersey, because Michael Matthews (in first place) wore the pink jersey as leader of the general classification during that stage.
 In stages 7 and 8, Maarten Tjallingii, who was second in the mountains classification, wore the blue jersey, because Michael Matthews (in first place) wore the pink jersey as leader of the general classification during that stage.
 In stage 17 and 18, Rafał Majka, who was second in the young riders classification, wore the white jersey, because Nairo Quintana (in first place) wore the pink jersey as leader of the general classification during that stage.
 In stages 19, 20, and 21, Fabio Aru, who was second in the young riders classification, wore the white jersey, because Nairo Quintana (in first place) wore the pink jersey as leader of the general classification during that stage.

Final standings

General classification

Points classification

Mountains classification

Young riders classification

Trofeo Fast Team classification

Trofeo Super Team classification

Minor classifications 

Other less well-known classifications, whose leaders do not receive a special jersey, were awarded during the Giro. These awards are based on points earned throughout the three weeks of the tour. Each mass-start stage has one intermediate sprint, the Traguardi Volante, or T.V. The T.V. sprints give bonus seconds towards the general classification, points towards the regular points classification, and also points towards the T.V. classification. This award was known by various names in previous years, and was previously time-based. It was won by Italian Marco Bandiera. The Premio della Fuga, rewards riders who take part in breakaways at the head of the field. Each rider in an escape of ten or fewer riders receives one point for each kilometre that the group stayed clear. Andrea Fedi won this classification.

Other awards include the Fighting Spirit (Combativity classification), which is a compilation of points gained for position on crossing intermediate sprints, mountain passes and stage finishes. This classification was won by Julián Arredondo. The Azzurri d'Italia classification is based on finishing order, but points were awarded only to the top three finishers in each stage. It was won by Frenchman Nacer Bouhanni. Teams take part in the Fair Play classification where teams are given penalty points for minor technical infringements. A new classification, the Energy Prize classification was introduced this year and awarded points to the rider with the fastest time in those last 3 km gets 4 points, the second 2 points and the third one point. The first winner of this was Enrico Battaglin.

References

Citations

External links 

Cyclingnews.com: Giro d'Italia 2014

 
Giro d'Italia
Giro d'Italia
Giro d'Italia by year
Giro d'Italia
Giro d'Italia